Kalmala  is a village in the northeast of the state of Karnataka, India. It is located in the Raichur taluk of Raichur district in raichur-bagalkot highway,Karnataka.

Demographics
As of 2001 India census, Kalmala had a population of 5797 with 2931 males and 2866 females.

See also
 Raichur
 Districts of Karnataka

References

External links
 http://Raichur.nic.in/

Villages in Raichur district